Gholaman may refer to:

 Gholaman Rural District, in Raz and Jargalan District, Bojnord County, North Khorasan Province, Iran
 Gholaman, a village in Gholaman Rural District
 Gholaman-e Olya, a village in Dowreh County, Lorestan Province, Iran
 Gholaman-e Sofla, a village in Dowreh County, Lorestan Province, Iran

See also
 Dahan-e Gholaman, an archeological site in eastern Iran
 Deh Gholaman, a village in Badakhshan Province, Afghanistan
 Now Bahar-e Gholaman, a village in Bakharz County, Razavi Khorasan Province, Iran